Mvara Secondary School is a mixed (day and boarding), co-educational secondary school in Arua District in the Northern Region of Uganda.

Location
The school is located in Mvara, Mvara Parish, Arua Hill Sub-county, within the city of Arua, the largest urban centre in the West Nile sub-region, in northwestern Uganda. The geographical coordinates of the school are:
03°01'24.0"N, 30°55'38.0"E (Latitude:3.023333; Longitude:30.927222).

History
Mvara Secondary School was established in 1960 by the Church Missionary Society. With peaceful relations between faculty and students since inception, Mvara began to experience a series of student strikes beginning circa 2016. The strikes were particularly worrisome as they were of a violent nature and involved destruction of school property. 

More violence broke out in 2017, this time between students of Mvara Secondary School and St. Joseph’s College Ombaci, again leading to destruction of school property at both schools.

Back in 2010 the Mvara Old Students Association identified lack of career guidance at the school as a major contributor to poor academic performance of the students.

Prominent alumni
Some of the prominent alumni of the school include: (a) Peace Proscovia Drajole Agondua, a professional Ugandan netball player and the current captain of the Uganda national netball team, who also plays for the Sunshine Coast Lightning in the Australian Super Netball League. and (b) James Acidiri, Member of Parliament for Maracha East County, Maracha District, in the 10th Parliament (2016 - 2021)

See also
 Education in Uganda
 List of schools in Uganda

References

External links
Reverend Canon Charles Collins Andaku Elected as Next Bishop of Madi and West Nile Diocese As of 13 November 2016.

Mixed schools in Uganda
Secondary schools in Uganda
Education in Uganda
Arua District
West Nile sub-region
Northern Region, Uganda
1960 establishments in the British Empire
Educational institutions established in 1960